Mount Joy Township is the name of some places in the U.S. state of Pennsylvania:

Mount Joy Township, Adams County, Pennsylvania
Mount Joy Township, Lancaster County, Pennsylvania

Pennsylvania township disambiguation pages